Sikanderpur is a village in the district of Jalandhar, Punjab, India. Sikanderpur is midway between Alawalpur and Dhogri, near Pathankot road. It was founded nearly 200 years ago by People with Cheema surname who relocated from Mulanpur to here.

The village has population of 1500 with many of the people having emigrated to the UK, Canada and USA. 
Sikanderpur can be reached by road from Delhi or the best way is to come via Amritsar Airport. There are regular flights to Amritsar on Jet Airways, Air India. Moreover due to its close proximity to Adampur, which has domestic airport it is easy to reach here. Sikanderpur is hardly 15 km from Jalandhar and 6 km from Adampur.

Population of Sikanderpur is Punjabi Speaking practising Sikh religion. Sikander pur is self sufficient due to the income generation from the Community Palace, which fuels development programs. Moreover, village houses Cooperative Society which has bank and provides seed and equipment support to the farmers. Villages has its own water supply, post office and medical facility. Sikander pur also has its mandi during wheat and rice season. In terms of education, 5 residents have retired as Deputy Superintend of Police. Other residents have gained success in Engineering, teaching professions too.

References
About Nawanshahr
Sikanderpur is also a village in Jalandhar on Dhogri Road near Alawalpur. This village has nothing to do with Alexander or Sikander. Most of its people are settled in UK, USA, CANjavascript:void(0);ADA and UAE. The nearest main railway station is Jalandhar City, about 8 km; new Adam Airport is also the same distance and opened for civil aviation. Spicejet operates daily flight between Delhi Airport and Adampur in the afternoon.

Nawanshahr
Villages in Shaheed Bhagat Singh Nagar district